Bipul Chettri is an Indian singer-songwriter who sings in the Nepali language and plays Himalayan folk music with a contemporary touch. His debut album, Sketches of Darjeeling, was released in July 2014 and his follow-up album, Maya in 2016 and six singles 'Basant', 'Gahiro Gahiro', 'Ashish', 'Teesta', 'Mughlan' and Neela Akash in the following years. His latest EP, 'Samaya' was released in 2021. He is based in New Delhi, India.

Early life

Bipul's grandfather was a poet and his grandmother used to play the sitar. His father picked up his parents' talent and used to perform in Darjeeling and Kurseong but passed away when Bipul was very young. Bipul credits his father for his inclination towards music and his choice of becoming a musician.

One of the tracks, "Ram Sailee", from his debut album, is an ode to his father.

Bipul attended St. Augustine's School in Kalimpong, Darjeeling where he was a regular performer as a student and subsequently picked up the western classical guitar as his primary instrument and graduated with a LTCL (Licentiate of Trinity College, London) in Western Classical Guitar from the Trinity Music School of London.

Musical career

Bipul's voice and musical abilities were introduced to the world with his song "Wildfire (Dadelo)". It was recorded and uploaded on SoundCloud in February 2013. This laid the foundation for his debut album Sketches of Darjeeling.

His debut album Sketches of Darjeeling was well received. He was the 'Top Selling Artist for 2014-15, and was in the Top Ten for 2015-16, on OKListen.Com, an indie retail music site in India. He won the 'Pop-Rock Album of the Year' for 'Sketches of Darjeeling', 'Best Pop-Rock Composition of the Year' & 'Best Male Pop Vocal Performance of the Year for his song "Syndicate" at the Hero Hits FM 91.2 Awards.

He released his follow-up album, Maya in 2016 and followed it up with six more singles 'Basant', 'Gahiro Gahiro', 'Ashish', 'Teesta', 'Mughlan' and Neela Akash and his latest EP, 'Samaya' released in 2021.
He is currently involved with "The Travelling Band" for all his live gigs.

Discography
 Sketches of Darjeeling (2014)
Maya (2016)
Basant (Single - 2017)
Gahiro Gahiro (Single - 2018)
Teesta (Single - 2019)
Mughlan (Single - 2019)
Aashish (Single - 2019)
Neela Akash (Single - 2020)
Samaya (2021)

References

External links
 

Indian male singers
Indian folk musicians
People from Kalimpong district
Year of birth missing (living people)
Living people
Nepali-language singers
Indian Gorkhas
Nepali-language singers from India